Arch Springs is an unincorporated community located in Tyrone Township, Blair County, Pennsylvania.  It is located on Kettle Road (Route 1013) approximately 0.3 miles to the south of Hileman Road (Route 1008).  Sinking Run flows through the community, and the Arch Spring itself is located on the creek.

The town of Skelp is about 4 miles to the west on Hileman Road, and Culp is about 4 miles to the southwest on Kettle Road.

References

Unincorporated communities in Blair County, Pennsylvania
Unincorporated communities in Pennsylvania